Reidun Gunnarson is a Norwegian handball player. She played 35 matches for the national handball team from 1989 to 1991, and participated at the 1990 World Women's Handball Championship, where the Norwegian team placed sixth.

References

Year of birth missing (living people)
Living people
Norwegian female handball players